Mykyta the Fox is the first Ukrainian animated series made in the country since it declared independence. The series is based on the eponymous satirical fairy tale in verse by Ivan Franko (an adaptation of the popular European tale of Reynard). The budget of the series amounted to UAH 10 million (according to alternative data, UAH 6 million). A theatrical pre-release was held at Kinopalats in Kyiv on 15 June 2007. The series premiered on TV in 2009 on Pershyi Natsionalnyi after it had been already released on DVD in 2008. The cartoon was also broadcast in other countries, including Latvia, Hungary, Poland and Turkey.

Plot
The series tells the story of a witty and cunning fox Mykyta, his adventures and relationships with his fellow animals.

Characters
 Mykyta the Fox
 Burmylo the Bear
 Hektor the Puppy
 The Vixen
 The Lion
 Murlyka the Cat
 Nesyty the Wolf
 Bazyliy the Goat
 The Hare
 The Cock
 The Sheep
 Fruzia the Monkey

Music
 The series soundtrack includes songs by GreenJolly, Okean Elzy, Braty Hadyukiny, and ABBA
 The score was composed with the participation of Myroslav Skoryk.

References

External links
The series trailer at YouTube

Ukrainian animated television series
2000s Ukrainian television series
2008 Ukrainian television series debuts
Films based on works by Ivan Franko